The Desired Woman  is a  1927 American silent drama film directed by Michael Curtiz and starring Irene Rich, William Russell and William Collier Jr. It is now considered to be lost. It was produced and distributed by Warner Bros. The film was based on a story by Darryl F. Zanuck, who was credited under the pseudonym Mark Canfield.

Synopsis
Lady Diana marries Captain Maxwell of the British Army in England. However, when her husband is posted to a remote post in the Sahara Desert she finds her life increasingly difficult. He becomes insanely jealous and threatens anyone who comes near his wife. He posts two subordinates on dangerous missions. Wearied by her experiences, she agrees to elope with one of them.

Cast
Irene Rich as Diana Maxwell
William Russell as Captain Maxwell
William Collier Jr. as Lieutenant Larry Trent
Douglas Gerrard as Fitzroy
Jack Ackroyd as Henery
John Miljan as Lieutenant Kellogg
Richard Tucker as Sir Sydney Vincent

See also
List of early Warner Bros. sound and talking features

References

Bibliography 
 Rode, Alan K. Michael Curtiz: A Life in Film. University Press of Kentucky, 2017.

External links
 

1927 films
Films directed by Michael Curtiz
1927 drama films
American black-and-white films
American silent feature films
Warner Bros. films
Silent American drama films
Lost American films
1927 lost films
Lost drama films
1920s American films
Films set in London
Films set in Africa